The flag of the City of Madrid represents the city's coat of arms centred on a crimson field. The flag is made either in the proportions 3:5 or 2:3, and in shades of crimson corresponding to Pantone 207 or 208.

The significance of the bear leaning against a madroño, or strawberry tree, is unknown; however, the tree is native to Madrid. One known theory is that bear and tree represent a farming rights dispute between the clergy and citizens. The seven stars supposedly represent the seven stars in the Starry Plough constellation closest to the Ursa Major (Great Bear) Constellation. These stars symbolise the North and therefore, since North is the direction on which all others are based, the stars represent Madrid as the seat of government for Spain.

References

External links

Flags of cities in Spain
Flag
Flag
Flags displaying animals
Flags introduced in 1967